Lafi is a surname. Notable people with the surname include:

 Fadi Lafi (born 1979), Palestinian footballer
 Nora Lafi (born 1965), French historian of Algerian origin
 Olfa Lafi (born 1986), Tunisian race walker